The Mixed Team Racing Optimist (U16)  is a sailing event on the Sailing at the Southeast Asian Games programme at the National Sailing Centre.

Schedule
All times are Singapore Standard Time (UTC+08:00)

Results

Preliminary round

Knockout round

References

Team Racing Optimist
Optimist competitions
Team racing competitions